Lobophytum laevigatum is a species of soft coral in the family Alcyoniidae.

References 

Alcyoniidae